Dunbar is an unincorporated community located in Houston County, Georgia, United States, located in the extreme northwestern corner of Houston County, one mile east of U.S. Route 41 at the intersection of Dunbar and Houston Lake Roads. It is part of the Warner Robins, Georgia Metropolitan Statistical Area.

History
The community of Dunbar dates back to at least 1915, as it appeared on official Georgia maps.  The community is named for the Dunbar family, who once owned much of the surrounding land.  Dunbar has never been an incorporated city and is not recognized as a community on most maps.  However, there are signs that designate the area as "Dunbar Community".

A Holiday Food Store is the only business in Dunbar. Also known simply as "The Corner Store", it sells gasoline and groceries.

The Crossroads Trading Post, which is now defunct, is located across from the Holiday Food Store. It has been closed for over ten years, but the building is still there and is merely used for storage by the former owners.

The primary industry in Dunbar is agriculture. There are a few farms located within Dunbar which yield cattle, pecans, strawberries, and cotton.

Churches
Westside Baptist Church came to Dunbar in 2002. It is the only place of worship in Dunbar.

Unincorporated communities in Houston County, Georgia
Unincorporated communities in Georgia (U.S. state)